The Journal of Contemporary Health Law and Policy is a law review run by students at the Columbus School of Law (The Catholic University of America, Washington, D.C.). It was established in 1985 by George P. Smith II and is published semi-annually. The journal covers health-related issues, including legal analysis of recent trends in modern health care, issues involving the relationship of the life sciences to the social sciences and humanities, bioethics, and ethical, economic, philosophical and social aspects of medical practice and the delivery of health care systems.

Abstracting and indexing 
The Journal of Contemporary Health Law and Policy is abstracted and indexed in Index of Legal Periodicals, LexisNexis, Westlaw, Current Index to Legal Periodicals, Current Law Index, BIOSIS, MEDLINE, and Current Contents/Health Services Administration.

Symposia 
The journal organizes an annual symposium at the Columbus School of Law on current issues in the health and legal fields.

Notable contributors 
 Richard Posner, "The Ethics and Economics of Enforcing Contracts of Surrogate Motherhood", Vol. V
 Michale Kirby, "The Human Genome Project – Promise and Problem", Volume XII
 Raymond O'Brien, "Pedophilia: The Legal Predicament of the Clergy", Vol. IV
 Edmund D. Pellegrino, "Balancing Science, Ethics, and Politics: Stem Cell Research, a Paradigm Case", Vol. XVIII

External links 

 

American law journals
Biannual journals
Columbus School of Law
English-language journals
Publications established in 1985
Catholic University of America academic journals
1985 establishments in Washington, D.C.